Dallas Hood (born 11 December 1977) is a former professional rugby league footballer who played in the 1990s and 2000s.

Playing career
Hood played as an interchange/substitute in the Sydney Roosters 6-14 defeat by the Brisbane Broncos in the 2000 NRL Grand Final at Stadium Australia on Sunday 27 August 2000.

References

External links
Wildcats turn to Hood

1977 births
Living people
People educated at Keebra Park State High School
Place of birth missing (living people)
Rugby league props
Rugby league second-rows
Sydney Roosters players
Wakefield Trinity players
Australian rugby league players